Natalie Mwangale (born September 7, 1993) is a Kenyan basketball player. She plays for the Kenyan Ports Authority and the Kenya women's national basketball team.

Professional career
Mwagale plays for the Kenyan Ports Authority Basketball team.

Kenyan National Women's Basketball team
Mwagale plays 3x3 basketball for the Kenya 3x3 basketball national team. She also plays  for the Kenya women's national basketball team, she participated in the 2021 Women's Afrobasket tournament where she averaged 8 points, 4.7 rebounds and 4.3 assists.

Reference

Living people
Kenyan women's basketball players
1993 births
Basketball people from Nairobi
Kenyan women's 3x3 basketball players